Belnapia soli  is a Gram-negative, aerobic, non-spore-forming and non-motile bacterium from the genus of Belnapia which has been isolated from soil from Daejeon in Korea.

References

External links
Type strain of Belnapia soli at BacDive -  the Bacterial Diversity Metadatabase	

Rhodospirillales
Bacteria described in 2013